The Shrine of Jesus, the Divine Teacher, popularly referred to as PLM Chapel, is a church largely used by students and employees of PLM (Pamantasan ng Lungsod ng Maynila).  One side of the church houses a chapel dedicated to the Virgin Mary as the Immaculate Conception, patroness of the City of Manila and of the Philippines, while another side chapel is dedicated to St. Joseph.

Apart from San Agustin Church and Manila Cathedral, it is one of the 9 churches within the walled city of Intramuros in downtown Manila which is popular for people doing the Visita Iglesia during the Holy week.

History 
PLM Chapel was established in 1990 through the efforts of then Bishop Teodoro Bacani, Jr.  It is a Catholic Church, and Catholicism is the majority denomination of Christianity in the Philippines and the University. The chapel was blessed and inaugurated by Jaime Cardinal L. Sin, Archbishop of Manila, on 17 December 1990.

On June 29, 2019, Ambassador Koji Haneda of Japan attended the Blessing and Installation of the Statue of Blessed Takayama Ukon, and the unveiling of his historical marker at the PLM Chapel. The ceremony was hosted by Archbishop of Manila Luis Antonio Cardinal Tagle. Apostolic Nuncio Gabriele Giordano Caccia also attended the ceremony.  The statue was installed at the PLM Chapel, followed by the unveiling of the markers which follow Takayama Ukon's journey in Manila.

References 

Pamantasan ng Lungsod ng Maynila